Wawrzyniec Gembicki (5 August 1559 – 10 February 1624) was a Roman Catholic prelate who served as Archbishop of Gniezno (1616–1624), Bishop of Włocławek (1610–1616), and Bishop of Chelmno (1600–1610).

Biography
Wawrzyniec Gembicki was born in Gembitz, Poland on 5 August 1559. On 10 November 1600, he was appointed during the papacy of Pope Clement VIII as Bishop of Chelmno.
On 1 April 1601, he was consecrated bishop by Claudio Rangoni. On 19 April 1610, he was appointed during the papacy of Pope Paul V as Bishop of Włocławek. On 14 March 1616, he was appointed during the papacy of Pope Paul V as Archbishop of Gniezno. He served as Archbishop of Gniezno until his death on 10 February 1624. While bishop, he was the principal consecrator of Jan Wężyk, Bishop of Przemyśl (1620).

References

External links
 Virtual tour Gniezno Cathedral 
List of Primates of Poland 

17th-century Roman Catholic bishops in the Polish–Lithuanian Commonwealth
Bishops appointed by Pope Clement VIII
Bishops appointed by Pope Paul V
1559 births
1624 deaths
Crown Vice-Chancellors